Venigalla Satyanarayana (5 October 1918 – 1980) was an Indian politician who was a Member of Parliament, representing Andhra Pradesh in the Rajya Sabha the upper house of India's Parliament as a member of the Indian National Congress.

Satyanarayana died in office in 1980.

References

1918 births
1980 deaths
Indian National Congress politicians
Rajya Sabha members from Andhra Pradesh